Henry Durand may refer to:

Henry Marion Durand (1812–1871), British soldier and colonial administrator
Henry Mortimer Durand (1850–1924), British diplomat and civil servant of colonial British India
Henry R. Durand (1855–1932), restaurateur, president and general manager of the H. R. Durand Restaurant Company
Henry Strong Durand (1861–1929), Yale alumnus and writer

See also
Henry Durant (disambiguation)